The following is a list of football stadiums in Poland, ordered by capacity (at least 10,000 capacity).
In italics – currently under construction or reconstruction

UEFA category 4 stadiums are marked by

Football stadiums with a capacity below 10,000

Stadiums with a capacity of at least 5,000 are included.

See also
List of European stadiums by capacity
List of association football stadiums by capacity

References

External links
Stadiums in Poland
List of Stadiums Pictures in Poland

 
Poland
Football stadiums